David Chiu (born August 23, 1960 in Davenport, Iowa) is a Chinese American professional poker player, based in Las Vegas, Nevada, who has won five World Series of Poker bracelets. He is also the winner of the 2008 World Poker Tour's WPT World Championship, and the first winner of the Tournament of Champions of Poker.

Chiu was a restaurant owner in Colorado. He took a second job as a poker dealer and later became a poker tournament specialist who earned a reputation for himself by winning the $2,000 limit hold'em event at the 1996 World Series of Poker (WSOP).

Chiu also cashed in the WSOP $10,000 No Limit Texas Hold 'em main event in 1996 (10th), 2003 (55th), and 2006 (416th.)

Personal life
Due to a swimming accident, Chiu is partially deaf in both ears. However, Chiu says that this has allowed him to concentrate more on reading his opponents at the table.

World Poker Tour 
Chiu regularly plays World Poker Tour (WPT) events and has made two WPT final tables. At the Season 1 WPT Invitational event in 2003, he finished 3rd behind Layne Flack and Jerry Buss. In April 2008, Chiu won the Season 6 WPT Championship, overcoming Gus Hansen's more than 6:1 chip lead at the beginning of heads-up play to claim the title and the $3,389,140 prize.

As of 2016, his total live tournament winnings exceed $8,030,000. His 60 cashes as the WSOP account for $3,371,037 of those winnings.

World Series of Poker Bracelets

References

External links
 Official site

1960 births
American poker players
American people of Chinese descent
American people of Macanese descent
Chinese poker players
Living people
World Series of Poker bracelet winners
World Poker Tour winners
American deaf people